Paulo Jorge Gomes Bento (born 20 June 1969) is a Portuguese football manager and former player.

A defensive midfielder with tackling ability and workrate as his main assets, he played for two of the major three teams in his country, amassing Primeira Liga totals of 284 matches and 16 goals over 11 seasons, and also spent four years in Spain. He represented the Portugal national team in the 2002 World Cup and Euro 2000.

Bento took up a coaching career in 2005, managing Sporting CP for four years and four months, with relative success, and won a Super League Greece title with Olympiacos. He managed the national teams of his country and South Korea for four years apiece, taking each team to a World Cup and continental tournament.

Playing career
Born in Lisbon, Bento played professionally in his homeland for C.F. Estrela da Amadora, Vitória de Guimarães and S.L. Benfica, and had a four-year abroad spell with Real Oviedo, helping the Spanish club always retain its La Liga status before moving to Sporting CP, where he finished his career as a player. With the latter, he was part of the star-studded team that achieved the double in 2002 under the direction of Laszlo Bölöni, contributing 31 games and one goal in the Primeira Liga and playing alongside Mário Jardel and João Vieira Pinto among others.

Bento earned 35 caps for the Portugal national team, his first game coming on 15 January 1992 in a 0–0 draw with Spain and his last being the 0–1 loss to South Korea on 14 June 2002 in the 2002 FIFA World Cup. He also played at UEFA Euro 2000 where, along with teammates Abel Xavier – who played with him at Oviedo for two seasons – and Nuno Gomes, he was suspended (in Bento's case for five months) due to bad behaviour, during the semi-final defeat against France.

Coaching career

Sporting CP
After an emotional 2004 retirement, aged 35, Bento got the job of Sporting's youth team coach. He won the junior championship in 2005, and developed a base to the future. After the sacking of José Peseiro midway through 2005–06 season, he was promoted to first-team duties in spite of being relatively inexperienced.

Despite a slow start, Bento managed an impressive turnaround of Sporting's fortunes in the second half of the campaign, as a series of ten consecutive wins placed them within distance of leaders and eventual league champions FC Porto, as the former went on to rank second in that and the following seasons, achieving direct qualification to the UEFA Champions League. He was responsible for bringing youth products Nani, João Moutinho and Miguel Veloso into the spotlight.

Bento signed a new two-year contract in June 2007. His side had a turbulent pre-season in preparation for 2007–08, with defense mainstays Rodrigo Tello and Marco Caneira leaving the club while Portuguese international goalkeeper Ricardo was sold to Real Betis. With little resources to invest, the club brought Eastern promises – Marat Izmailov, Vladimir Stojković and Simon Vukčević – aboard.

After a very irregular season, Bento managed to lead the team to an unprecedented third consecutive qualification for the Champions League, with another second-place finish in spite of spending most of the year below third, pipping Guimarães and Benfica in the final matchday. He also retained the Taça de Portugal, beating Porto in the final (2–0 after extra time) after knocking-out eternal rivals Benfica in the last-four stage with a 5–3 win.

Bento's team broke a number of long-standing club records, including the first season without home defeats since 1987, the first capture of back-to-back Portuguese cups since 1974 and the first time since 1962 that Sporting finished three consecutive campaigns in the top two league positions. At the age of 38, he also became only the sixth manager in the history of Portuguese football to win back-to-back Portuguese cups, alongside the likes of János Biri, John Mortimore or José Maria Pedroto.

On 15 July 2008, The Sun and The Daily Telegraph reported that Manchester United were planning to hire Bento (reportedly Cristiano Ronaldo's friend and former teammate) as manager Alex Ferguson's new assistant after the departure of previous number two Carlos Queiroz to manage the Portugal national team. He quickly denied any speculation, and reaffirmed his intention to stay put.

On 16 August 2008, Bento managed Sporting to a 2–0 victory in the Supertaça Cândido de Oliveira over champions Porto, at the opening of the new season. One of the players that were kept in the team despite heavy criticism, Rui Patrício, was a key element and saved a penalty from Lucho González during the second half; this win raised the manager's tally in cup finals against counterpart Jesualdo Ferreira to 3–0 (2007 and 2008 Supercups, and the 2008 Portuguese Cup), and it also marked the first ever capture of back-to-back Portuguese Supercups in the Lions history.

Already the second-most successful coach in the history of the club in terms of trophies won, only surpassed by József Szabó, Bento gained the nickname "Cup-Eater" as a consequence of the four pieces of silverware added to the Estádio José Alvalade cabinet under his command. He led his team to a 1–0 home defeat of FC Shakhtar Donetsk on 4 November 2008, therefore mathematically securing automatic qualification for the knockout stages of the Champions League for the first time in their history; in the process, they also broke the club's record number of points in UEFA's main competition (nine) and remarkably did so with two matches to spare, becoming the first team to qualify from the group phase (alongside FC Barcelona, from the same group).

Later, Bento and Sporting also broke the record for most goals suffered by a team in a Champions League knockout round, after a 1–12 aggregate elimination at the hands of FC Bayern Munich in the round of 16. In the league, another second place to Porto befell, with the season also featuring the controversial Taça da Liga final loss against Benfica, on penalties.

That Champions League ousting marked the beginning of fan discontent towards Bento, especially regarding the team's playing style, which was perceived as becoming dull and unattractive, as presidential elections were to be held. Supported by the winning candidate José Eduardo Bettencourt, he signed a two-year contract extension; in spite of maintaining the same base squad and adding the talent of Felipe Caicedo or Matías Fernández, Sporting was unable to start the new campaign brightly: knocked out in the Champions League playoff round by ACF Fiorentina on away goals, the side's form slumped quickly and after nine matches they found themselves mired in seventh place, 12 points behind leaders S.C. Braga.

After a 1–1 home draw in the Europa League group stage against FK Ventspils on 5 November 2009, and facing considerable pressure to step down, Bento resigned.

Portugal

On 20 September 2010, following Queiroz's dismissal after a poor start to the Euro 2012 qualifying campaign, Bento was named his successor, initially until the last match of that stage. His first game in charge was on 8 October, a 3–1 win against Denmark in Porto.

On 17 November 2010, Portugal defeated World Cup champions Spain 4–0 in Lisbon, imposing the largest loss to its Iberian neighbours since 13 June 1963 (6–2 against Scotland, in another friendly). He led the national team to the Euro 2012 semi-finals in Poland and Ukraine, where they narrowly lost to eventual champions Spain on penalties.

Bento led Portugal to a 4–2 aggregate victory over Sweden in the playoffs after a second-place finish in the 2014 World Cup qualifiers, securing a spot at the finals in Brazil. On 9 April 2014, he extended his contract until after Euro 2016, but the national team exited in the World Cup's group stage in spite of a 2–1 win against Ghana in the last match, with the United States progressing on goal difference instead.

On 11 September 2014, after the Euro 2016 qualifying campaign began with a 0–1 home defeat to Albania, the Portuguese Football Federation announced Bento had been fired.

Cruzeiro
Bento moved abroad for the first time in his managerial career on 11 May 2016, taking the helm at Brazil's Cruzeiro Esporte Clube. His first game, ten days later, was a 2–2 draw at home to Figueirense FC which continued his side's winless start to the season.

On 25 July 2016, Bento resigned from the club following a 1–2 home loss against Sport Club do Recife.

Olympiacos
On 11 August 2016, Bento became the head coach of Super League Greece title holders Olympiacos FC. He was sacked on 6 March 2017 with the team seven points clear at the top of the table and qualified for the semi-finals of the domestic cup and last 16 of the Europa League, mainly due to a string of poor performances in official competitions, a three-game losing streak in the league with no goals scored and various press conference comments targeting the "weakness" of certain squad members and the roster as a whole.

Chongqing Dangdai Lifan
On 11 December 2017, Bento was appointed manager at Chongqing Dangdai Lifan FC. The following 22 July, he was relieved of his duties due to poor results.

South Korea
On 17 August 2018, Bento was appointed manager of South Korea, with a contract to include the 2022 World Cup; he stated he would focus on 'build-up football' as his main strategy, emphasizing on Korea's longer communication of shorter passes and maintaining bigger possession and forwarding skills, which was considered a more unusual style of play as the team was previously used to playing defensively. At the 2019 AFC Asian Cup in the United Arab Emirates, the side were eliminated 1–0 in the quarter-finals by eventual champions Qatar.

Bento led his team to the 2019 EAFF E-1 Football Championship after a 1–0 defeat of Japan. This marked the third time they won the tournament, this being the second consecutive victory over that opposition.

On 1 February 2022, with a 2–0 away win over Syria, the Bento-led Taegeuk Warriors qualified for that year's World Cup, the nation's tenth consecutive edition. On 23 November, in the finals in Qatar, he was booked in the group-stage fixture against Uruguay for dissent near the end of the 0–0 draw. In the next match, a 3–2 loss to Ghana, he was shown a red card for arguing with referee Anthony Taylor after the final whistle. Having qualified for the round of 16 for the first time in 12 years with a 2–1 victory over his native Portugal, he lost 4–1 to Brazil, and left his post shortly after, stating he wanted to take a break and that the decision was made in September; he added he was proud of the team's accomplishments, and felt the squad was one of the best groups he had worked with.

Career statistics
Club

Managerial statistics

Honours
PlayerEstrela AmadoraTaça de Portugal: 1989–90BenficaTaça de Portugal: 1995–96Sporting CPPrimeira Liga: 2001–02
Taça de Portugal: 2001–02
Supertaça Cândido de Oliveira: 2002

ManagerSporting CPTaça de Portugal: 2006–07, 2007–08
Supertaça Cândido de Oliveira: 2007, 2008
Taça da Liga runner-up: 2007–08, 2008–09OlympiacosSuper League Greece: 2016–17South KoreaEAFF E-1 Football Championship: 2019Individual'
CNID Breakthrough Coach: 2005–06

References

External links

1969 births
Living people
Portuguese footballers
Footballers from Lisbon
Association football midfielders
Primeira Liga players
C.F. Estrela da Amadora players
Vitória S.C. players
S.L. Benfica footballers
Sporting CP footballers
La Liga players
Real Oviedo players
Portugal international footballers
UEFA Euro 2000 players
2002 FIFA World Cup players
Portuguese expatriate footballers
Expatriate footballers in Spain
Portuguese expatriate sportspeople in Spain
Portuguese football managers
Primeira Liga managers
Sporting CP managers
Campeonato Brasileiro Série A managers
Cruzeiro Esporte Clube managers
Super League Greece managers
Olympiacos F.C. managers
Portugal national football team managers
UEFA Euro 2012 managers
2014 FIFA World Cup managers
South Korea national football team managers
2019 AFC Asian Cup managers
2022 FIFA World Cup managers
Portuguese expatriate football managers
Expatriate football managers in Brazil
Expatriate football managers in Greece
Expatriate football managers in China
Expatriate football managers in South Korea
Portuguese expatriate sportspeople in Brazil
Portuguese expatriate sportspeople in Greece
Portuguese expatriate sportspeople in China
Portuguese expatriate sportspeople in South Korea